The Jordan Basketball Federation is the governing body of basketball in Jordan.

The federation founded in 1957, represents basketball with public authorities as well as with national and international sports organizations and as such with Jordan in international competitions. It also defends the moral and material interests of Basketball in Jordan. It is affiliated with FIBA and FIBA Asia.

The federation also organizes the Jordan national basketball team and the Jordan women's national basketball team.

Leagues
Jordan Basketball League

References 

Official website of the Jordan Basketball Federation
FIBA Profile

1957 establishments in Jordan
Basketball in Jordan
Basketball governing bodies in Asia
Sports organizations established in 1957